Loknayak Jai Prakash Institute of Technology (LNJPIT),  is a government engineering college in Bihar. It is managed by the Department of Science and Technology, Bihar. It is approved and recognized by the All India Council for Technical Education , it is one of [TEQUIPIII] colleges funded and taken care directly by central govt and is affiliated to the Aryabhatta Knowledge University of Patna.

The main campus of this college is located on side of National Highway 19 (also known as Chapra–Patna Highway) on the outskirts of Saran District, 6 kilometers from Chhapra, located on the banks of the Ganges River.

Departments 
 Mechanical Engineering
 Civil Engineering
 Computer Science and Engineering
 Electrical Engineering
 Physics
 Chemistry
 Mathematics
 Humanities

Degree programs

Bachelor of Technology (B.Tech.) 
LNJPIT has the following branches at the Bachelor of Technology level:

Master of Technology (M.Tech.) 
LNJPIT has the following branches at the Master of Engineering level:
 Thermal Engineering (Under Mechanical Engineering Department)

Admissions 

From 2019 onwards, admissions in the first year of state government engineering colleges of Bihar is based on performance in JEE-Main. The BCECE Board conducts Under Graduate Engineering Admission Counselling (UGEAC) for this purpose.

For lateral entry in the second year, Diploma in Engineering is required. The merit list is prepared on the basis of performance in BCECE(LE), an examination conducted by BCECE Board.

Facilities

College facilities 
 Computer Science Arena
 Wifi
 Restaurant
 Hostel Mess
 Guest house
 Playground

Library 
Loknayak Jai Prakash Institute of Technology has a library.

Hostel 
The institute is residential in nature. There are four boys hostels which have the capacity to accommodate 800 students and one girls hostel has the capacity to accommodate 200 students. Guest house for parents and others located on campus.

See also 

 Indian Institute of Technology Patna
 Aryabhatta Knowledge University
 All India Council for Technical Education
 Education in India

References

External links 
 

Memorials to Jayaprakash Narayan
Engineering colleges in Bihar
Colleges affiliated to Aryabhatta Knowledge University
2012 establishments in Bihar
Educational institutions established in 2012